The Treaty of Thapathali was a treaty signed between the Tibetan government of Ganden Phodrang and the Kingdom of Nepal in Thapathali Durbar in Kathmandu, the capital of Nepal, following the Nepalese–Tibetan War. In January 1856, a representative group of Tibet came to Kathmandu for discussion of the treaty. After a long discussion, the representative group ultimately signed a treaty on 24 March.

Failure of first attempt
A meeting of delegation teams was first called in Shikarjong but no decision was made. The Nepali delegation team returned, as they were to discuss with the prime minister, Jung Bahadur Rana. In the meeting with Tibetan delegation, Jung Bahadur demanded one crore rupees for expenses of war and the return of all Tibetan land captured by Nepal. It was very hard for the Tibetan delegation to make such a decision, so Kaji Til Bikram was sent to Sikarjong along with the Tibetans in September. The ambassador of China replied that he could offer four lakhs rupees for war expenses and five lakhs rupees as reparations for the destruction of Nepalese troops in Lhasa. The ambassador also stressed that Tibet was a state of China and the Emperor gave it to the local monks only for religious purpose, so Tibet was not subjected to give any land to Nepal; if Nepal did not return immediately from Tibet then Nepal must be ready to fight war with China. As the Nepalese were not in support of this condition, the attempt of Treaty failed.

Treaty of Thapathali 

In March of the sixth year of Xianfeng (1856), the two sides signed a peace treaty in Thapathali, Nepal. There are ten articles in the treaty:

(1) Tibet pays 10,000 rupees as reparations to the Gurkhas annually.

(2) Gorkhas and Tibet shall always respect the great emperor. There are many monasteries in Tibet, and many practitioners live alone and follow religious rules.

(3) Afterwards, for Gurkha merchants and citizens, Tibet will not collect merchant tax, road tax and other taxes.

(4) Tibet allows the Sikh soldiers captured before and the Gurkha soldiers, officials, servicemen, women, and artillery positions captured in the war to be returned to the Gurkhas; All items left behind by Tibetans in Long, Nyalam, Tsongkha, Blang, and Rongju areas were returned to Tibet.

(5) Gurkhas will subsequently send a senior official to be stationed in Lhasa, but not Newars.

(6) Gurkhas are allowed to open shops in Lhasa to sell and buy jewelry, clothing, food, and other various items at will.

(7) If there are disputes between Lhasa businessmen and citizens, Gurkha officials are not allowed to interrogate them; if there are disputes between Gurkha merchants and residents in Lhasa or Kathmandu Muslims, they are not allowed to be interrogated by Tibetan officials; if there are disputes between Tibetan people and Gurkha people , The officials of the two sides will be interrogated together, the Tibetan people will be fined, and the Tibetan officials will be fined, and the Gurkha businessmen and Muslims will be fined and returned to the Gurkha officials.

(8) If the Gurkhas fled to Tibet for murder, Tibet handed them over and sent them to Gurkha; Tibetans fled to Gurkha because of murder, and the Gurkhas handed them over and sent to Tibet.

(9) Tibetan officials should investigate the property of the Gurkha merchants and citizens who robbed them and ordered them to be returned to their original owners. If the criminal cannot return the original item, the Gurkha officials should make him make a promise and pay him back within a time limit.

(10) After the treaty has been concluded, neither party shall retaliate against the family property of the Tibetans who are attached to the Gurkhas or the family property of the people who are attached to the Gorkhas of Tibet.

See also
Thapathali Durbar
History of Nepal
Tibet under Qing rule
Sino-Nepalese War
Nepalese–Tibetan War
China-Nepal relations

Treaties concluded in 1856
Treaties of Nepal
Treaties of Tibet
1850s in Tibet
19th century in Nepal
Nepal–Tibet relations
1856 in Nepal